Atli Gregersen (born 15 June 1982) is a Faroese international footballer who plays for Víkingur as a defender. He has been capped for the Faroe Islands at senior and youth level.

Career

Club career

Gregersen spent his early career playing in both the Faroe Islands and Denmark, for Randers FC, Lyngby BK, GÍ Gøta, IF Skjold, BK Frem and Víkingur. He signed for Scottish club Ross County in June 2010, before leaving the club in February 2011, having made just one appearance for them in the League Cup.

International career
Gregersen made his international debut in 2009, and by 2010 he was national team captain.

International goals
Scores and results list the Faroe Islands' goal tally first.

References

External links
 Profile at faroesoccer.com

1982 births
Living people
People from Tórshavn
Faroese footballers
Faroe Islands international footballers
Boldklubben Frem players
Randers FC players
Lyngby Boldklub players
Víkingur Gøta players
Ross County F.C. players
Faroese expatriate footballers
Expatriate footballers in Scotland
GÍ Gøta players
Association football defenders
Faroe Islands youth international footballers